Caladenia longicauda subsp. longicauda, commonly known as the white spider orchid, is a plant in the orchid family Orchidaceae and is endemic to the south-west of Western Australia. It has a single hairy leaf and up to four, mostly white flowers with long drooping, thread-like ends on the sepals and petals. It grows in woodland and forest.

Description
Caladenia longicauda subsp. longicauda is a terrestrial, perennial, deciduous, herb with an underground tuber and which sometimes grows as a solitary plant, otherwise in a small clump. The sepals and petals have long, brown, thread-like tips. Flowering occurs from August to October.

Taxonomy and naming
Caladenia longicauda was first formally described by John Lindley in 1840 and the description was published in A Sketch of the Vegetation of the Swan River Colony. In 2001 Stephen Hopper and Andrew Brown described eleven subspecies, including subspecies longicauda and the descriptions were published in Nuytsia. The specific epithet (longicauda) is a derived from the Latin words longus meaning “long" and cauda meaning "a tail" or "appendage" referring to the long thin ends of the sepals and petals.

Distribution and habitat
The white spider orchid is common to the south-west of a line between Lancelin and Mount Barker in the Avon Wheatbelt, Jarrah Forest, Mallee, Swan Coastal Plain and Warren biogeographic regions where it grows in woodland and forest.

Conservation
Caladenia longicauda subsp. longicauda is classified as "not threatened" by the Western Australian Government Department of Parks and Wildlife.

References

longicauda subsp. longicauda
Endemic orchids of Australia
Orchids of Western Australia
Plants described in 1840
Taxa named by John Lindley